Berlin Mills Railway 7 is a  steam locomotive at Steamtown National Historic Site in Scranton, Pennsylvania. It was built in 1911 by the Vulcan Iron Works for the Berlin Mills Railway, an industrial line in Berlin, New Hampshire. Number 7 worked there as a switcher until November 1944, when it was sold to the Groveton Papers Company of Groveton, New Hampshire. In 1956, it was finally replaced by a diesel locomotive, ending 45 years of use. After a few years of idleness, though, the locomotive was leased to the Woodsville, Blackmount and Haverhill Steam Railroad, a new tourist railroad near Haverhill. It operated as the only locomotive for this company until it folded after 1963.  It was ultimately donated to Steamtown by the Groveton Paper Company in 1969.

References 

Vulcan Iron Works locomotives
2-4-2ST locomotives
Preserved steam locomotives of Pennsylvania
Individual locomotives of the United States
Standard gauge locomotives of the United States
Railway locomotives introduced in 1911